Daniel Hecht is an American author and environmentalist. He has written seven novels which have been published in 12 languages and 75 editions throughout the world, including best-sellers in the United States, England, Holland, and Israel.

Early life 

Born in Croton Falls, New York, Hecht has lived in New York, the Philippines, Wisconsin, Washington DC, Virginia, Illinois, California, and Vermont.

Musical career 

Hecht began playing classical guitar in 1965, studying under John Mavreas at the North Shore Conservatory in Winnetka, Illinois, and James Yoghourtjian at the Wisconsin College Conservatory.  After studying music theory and composition at the University of Wisconsin, he played acoustic 6 and 12 string guitar and published three records: "Guitar" (1973), "Fireheart-Fireriver" (1977), released on Dragon's Egg Records, and "Willow" (1980), released on Windham Hill. “Willow” was also released in Europe, and Hecht’s individual compositions appear on compilation albums and videos.  He performed over 300 concerts throughout the United States, Europe, and China, both solo and with other musicians including Alex deGrassi, Michael Hedges, George Winston, Jonathan Winter, and John Fahey.  Significant venues include Carnegie Recital Hall (1969 and 1982), Great American Music Hall, Shanghai Conservatory, Beijing Conservatory, Faneuil Hall, and others.

Organizational development 
Hecht is an organizational development consultant active in the arts, environmental technology, and social services.  He served as board president of the Pyralisk Arts Center, in Montpelier, Vermont, from 1990 to 2003; he then served as executive director of Vermont Environmental Consortium (VEC), a statewide association of environmental science and technology firms, educational institutions, public agencies, and non-profit organizations based at Norwich University.

As director of VEC, he was commissioned by the Vermont Agency of Agriculture to produce "The Farm Energy Handbook," which he edited and co-wrote with 20 renewable energy and energy efficiency/conservation experts. He produced and scripted "The Green Makeover Video," a 45-minute video showing small businesses how to implement energy-efficiency and other green business practices, in collaboration with the Vermont Department of Public Service, Vermont Small Business Development Center, Efficiency Vermont, and other partners.  His weekly column, "The Green Grapevine," featuring profiles of Vermont green enterprises and current issues and developments in emerging green technologies, ran in five Vermont daily newspapers in 2006 - 2008.

From 2008 to 2011, he procured funding for and served as project manager for a study of Vermont's potential to produce energy from post-consumer food waste, funded by a $600,000 grant from the US Department of Energy.  Conducted in partnership with Central Vermont Solid Waste Management District and Vermont Technical College, the study led to the construction in 2013 of a $3.5 million food-waste and manure biodigester sited at Vermont Tech campus.  For two years, starting in 2010, he directed Reach Service Exchange Network, a $1 million pilot program, funded by the US Administration on Aging, to deliver services to seniors and people with disabilities through a mutual exchange system.

Post-secondary educational activities 
Hecht has taught literature and writing courses at the University of Iowa, Community College of Vermont, and Johnson State College.  Since 2010, he has been a faculty member in the Professional Writing Program at Champlain College, in Burlington, Vermont, teaching Advanced Fiction Writing, Grant Writing, and Creative Writing.

Bibliography
 Skull Session (1997)
 The Babel Effect (2000)
 Puppets (2001)
 City of Masks (2002)
 Land of Echoes (2004)
 Bones of the Barbary Coast (2006)
 On Brassard's Farm (2018).

References

External links

Official website

20th-century American novelists
21st-century American novelists
American male novelists
American fantasy writers
Iowa Writers' Workshop alumni
Living people
Place of birth missing (living people)
1950 births
20th-century American male writers
21st-century American male writers
Windham Hill Records artists